Korgon is a rural locality (a selo) and the administrative centre of Korgonskoye Rural Settlement, Ust-Kansky District, the Altai Republic, Russia. The population was 333 as of 2016. There are 3 streets.

Geography 
Korgon is located 63 km northwest of Ust-Kan (the district's administrative centre) by road. Vladimirovka is the nearest rural locality.

References 

Rural localities in Ust-Kansky District